Richard O'Farrell may refer to:

Richard O'Farrell (British Army officer) (died 1757), British Army officer
Richard O'Farrell (Irish Confederate), Irish soldier of the seventeenth century